Mike Shropshire (born May 22, 1942) is an American sportswriter. He has written for the Fort Worth Star-Telegram, The Dallas Morning News, Playboy, and Sports Illustrated. He has authored several books, including Seasons in Hell, an account of his tenure writing about the Texas Rangers baseball franchise during its early years.

Critical reception
Kirkus Reviews called Seasons in Hell a "tiresome 'gonzo' journalism account of mid-1970s life on the road with a big league ballclub" that is partially saved by some "dead-on character sketches." Esquire listed Seasons in Hell as one of the 20 best baseball books of all time, in 2013.

Books 
 Seasons In Hell (1996), 
 The Ice Bowl: The Green Bay Packers and Dallas Cowboys Season of 1967 (1997) 
 The Pro: A Golf Novel (2001), 
 When The Tuna Went Down to Texas (2004), 
 Runnin' With The Big Dogs (2006), 
 The Last Real Season (2008),

References

External links
 Review of The Last Real Season at Letters On Pages

Sportswriters from Texas
1942 births
Living people
American sportswriters